is a Japanese actress.

Personal life
Takeda was married to an American from 2000 until divorcing in 2016.  She currently lives with her daughter in San Diego.

Filmography
 Shuffle (1981) - Girl in playground
 High Teen Boogie (1982 aka "Haithīn bugi") - Momoko Miyashita
 Tropical Mystery: seishun kyowakoku (1984)
 A Promise (1986 aka "Ningen no yakusoku") - Naoko, Yoshio's daughter
 Aidoru wo sagase (1987)
 24 Hour Playboy (1989 aka "Ai to heisei no iro - Otoko") - Yuri Nodate
 Gurenbana (1993) - Yoko
 If: Moshimo (1993) TV series
 Zero Woman III: Keishichō 0-ka no onna (1996 aka Zero Woman: Assassin Lovers) - Rei
 Me wo tojite daite (1996 aka "Close Your Eyes and Hold Me") - Hanabusa
 Ghost School: Teacher Mako's Head (1997 aka "Reikai gakkō: Mako sensei no kubi")
 24 jikan dake no uso (1999 TV) - Yukari Sakai
 Big show! Hawaii ni utaeba (1999)
 Fly Me to the Saitama (2019)

References

External links

1968 births
Living people
Japanese actresses
People from Nagoya